Rudolph Ely Boschwitz (born November 7, 1930) is an American politician and businessman who served as a United States senator from Minnesota from 1978 until 1991. Boschwitz is a member of the Republican Party.

He was born in Berlin to a Jewish family. When Boschwitz was two years old, he and his family fled the country due to Adolf Hitler's rise to power. Boschwitz grew up in New Rochelle, New York, and graduated with a J.D. degree from New York University School of Law in 1953. Boschwitz moved to Minnesota where he started a retail lumber store chain named Plywood Minnesota (later renamed Home Valu). He grew the lumber chain into a successful business with 70 stores. Boschwitz became well-known for starring in Plywood Minnesota's television commercials, wearing his signature plaid flannel shirts. 

He first ran for elected office in Minnesota's 1978 U.S. Senate election and defeated Democratic incumbent Wendell Anderson. He was reelected in 1984 by a landslide margin. While serving in the U.S. Senate, he was the chair of the National Republican Senatorial Committee from 1987 until 1988. Boschwitz ran for reelection to a third term in the 1990 election against Democrat Paul Wellstone. Boschwitz significantly outspent and was expected to defeat Wellstone. However, Boschwitz lost in an upset election. He was defeated again by Wellstone in a rematch election in 1996. Boschwitz was later appointed to the United Nations Commission on Human Rights by then-President George W. Bush. He served on the commission from 2005 until 2006. 

Boschwitz notably had a popular flavored milk stand at the Minnesota State Fair. He also is a significant fundraiser for Republican candidates.

Early life and education

Boschwitz was born November 7, 1930, in Berlin, Germany, the son of Lucy (née Dawidowicz) and Eli Boschwitz. In 1933, when he was three years old, his Jewish family fled from Nazi Germany to the United States, settling in New Rochelle, New York, where he grew up. A graduate of the Pennington School, he attended Johns Hopkins University and graduated from the New York University Stern School of Business in 1950 and the New York University School of Law in 1953.

Career
He was admitted to the New York State bar in 1954 and the Wisconsin bar in 1959. He served in the United States Army Signal Corps in 1954–55. He was the founder and chairman of a plywood and home improvement retailer, Plywood Minnesota, which later became Home Valu Interiors.

Boschwitz was elected as an Republican to the United States Senate in November 1978 and was subsequently appointed on December 30, 1978, to fill the vacancy caused by the resignation of Wendell Anderson, who was appointed to fill the seat after Walter Mondale was elected Vice President two years earlier. Boschwitz was well known in Minnesota for operating a "flavored milk" booth at the Minnesota State Fair.

Boschwitz voted in favor of the bill establishing Martin Luther King Jr. Day as a federal holiday and the Civil Rights Restoration Act of 1987 (as well as to override President Reagan's veto). Boschwitz voted in favor of the nomination of Robert Bork to the U.S. Supreme Court.

Boschwitz is known for one of the more interesting campaign buttons in Minnesota politics; the Minnesota Democratic-Farmer-Labor Party alleged that Boschwitz's donors were "fat cats", so Boschwitz's campaign created a "skinny cat" campaign button to be worn by those who had donated less than $100 to his campaign.

After his defeat in 1990 by Paul Wellstone, Boschwitz ran against Wellstone again in 1996 but lost.

In 1991 he traveled to Ethiopia as the emissary of President George H. W. Bush. The negotiations Boschwitz led in Ethiopia resulted in Operation Solomon. Over 14,000 Jewish people were airlifted from Ethiopia to Israel. Operation Solomon took twice as many Beta Israel émigrés to Israel as Operation Moses and Operation Joshua combined.

He was a top "Bush Pioneer" in 2000, fund-raising $388,193, and a "Bush Ranger" in 2004, raising at least $200,000 for George W. Bush's campaign fund in that election cycle.

In 2005, Bush named Boschwitz as the United States Ambassador to the United Nations Commission on Human Rights, which met at the U.N. in Geneva, Switzerland.

He also supported John McCain in the 2008 presidential election. He appeared at a McCain Straight Talk Town Hall Meeting in Lakeville, MN on October 10, 2008.

He presently serves on the board of directors of the Jewish Institute for National Security Affairs, is an AIPAC Board Member, and is a member of the Council on Foreign Relations.

Electoral history
 1978 Race for U.S. Senate
 Rudy Boschwitz (R), 57%
 Wendell Anderson (DFL) (inc.), 40%
 1984 Race for U.S. Senate
 Rudy Boschwitz (R) (inc.), 58%
 Joan Anderson Growe (DFL), 41%
 1990 Race for U.S. Senate
 Paul Wellstone (DFL), 50%
 Rudy Boschwitz (R) (inc.), 48%
 1996 Race for U.S. Senate
 Paul Wellstone (DFL) (inc.), 50%
 Rudy Boschwitz (R), 41%
 Dean Barkley (Ref.), 7%

See also
 List of Jewish members of the United States Congress
 List of United States senators born outside the United States

References

External links
 Rudy Boschwitz: An Inventory of His Papers at the Minnesota Historical Society
 

1930 births
Living people
Jewish American military personnel
Jewish emigrants from Nazi Germany to the United States
Jewish United States senators
Johns Hopkins University alumni 
Military personnel from New York City
Minnesota Republicans
New York University Stern School of Business alumni
New York University School of Law alumni
Politicians from New Rochelle, New York
People with acquired American citizenship
New York (state) lawyers
Wisconsin lawyers
United States Army personnel
Republican Party United States senators from Minnesota
Representatives of the United States to the United Nations Human Rights Council
20th-century American lawyers
20th-century American politicians
Hudson Institute
The Pennington School alumni
Jewish American people in Minnesota politics
Politicians from Berlin
21st-century American Jews
Members of Congress who became lobbyists